Thomas Vonn (born December 3, 1975) is an American former alpine ski racer with the U.S. Ski Team.

Biography
Vonn, who is of German descent, graduated from St. Lawrence University in Canton, New York, in 2001.

Primarily a giant slalom racer, Vonn's best finish in international competition was in the Super-G at the 2002 Winter Olympics, where he placed ninth. He was then-wife Lindsey Vonn's coach when she won gold at the 2010 Winter Olympics in Vancouver. He also coached Dean Travers, beginning in 2015.

Personal life
He married fellow ski racer Lindsey Kildow on September 29, 2007, at the Silver Lake Lodge in Deer Valley, Utah.  Lindsey Vonn became the World Cup overall champion in 2008, 2009, 2010, and 2012, and a 2010 Olympic gold medalist. They filed for divorce in November 2011; it was finalized on January 9, 2013.  After divorcing Lindsey Vonn, Thomas Vonn began a relationship with Shauna Kane.  Shauna gave birth to their son, Henrik Vonn, in 2018.

References

External links
 
 Thomas Vonn World Cup standings at the International Ski Federation
 
 Ski Racing.com – 05-Dec-2002 – article on Thomas Vonn
 Ski Racing.com – 02-Oct-2007 – Vonn wedding coverage

1975 births
Living people
American male alpine skiers
Olympic alpine skiers of the United States
Alpine skiers at the 2002 Winter Olympics